The French drop, also known as "Le Tourniquet", is a sleight of hand method used by magicians to vanish a small object such as a coin or ball. It is one of the oldest methods of vanishing, however it is still effective when properly executed. Although the method is known as a vanish, it can also be used as a switch or transformation, giving rise to numerous possibilities.

Method
The object is held between the thumb and first two finger tips. When using a coin, it is held by its edges and tilted up slightly so it can be seen by the spectators. The other hand appears to take the coin, placing the thumb behind the coin and the fingers in front, however the coin is left behind and palmed.

References

External links
The French Drop
YouTube demonstration video

Magic tricks
Coin magic
Sleight of hand